During the 1976–77 English football season, Leicester City F.C. competed in the Football League First Division.

Season summary
In the 1976–77 season, Leicester made a slow start with 6 consecutive draws but after 13 games, the Foxes were fifth in the table and in the UEFA Cup places despite scoring 13 goals. Then on though, throughout the season was ensured by lack of consistency and finished the campaign with 1 win in 10 league matches but despite that poor run, the Foxes finished in 11th place. A week after the season was over, Jimmy Bloomfield resigned as Leicester boss.

Final league table

Results
Leicester City's score comes first

Legend

Football League First Division

FA Cup

League Cup

Squad

References

Leicester City F.C. seasons
Leicester City